The 2022 UEFA Champions League final was the final match of the 2021–22 UEFA Champions League, the 67th season of Europe's premier club football tournament organised by UEFA, and the 30th season since it was renamed from the European Champion Clubs' Cup to the UEFA Champions League. It was played at the Stade de France in Saint-Denis, France, on 28 May 2022, between English club Liverpool and Spanish club Real Madrid. It was the third time the two sides have met in the European Cup final, after 1981 and 2018, the third final held at the Stade de France, after the 2000 and 2006 finals, and the first time the same two teams have met in three finals.

This was the first final to be played in front of a full attendance since the 2019 final, as the previous two finals were affected by the COVID-19 pandemic. The final was originally scheduled to be played at the Allianz Arena in Munich. After the postponement and relocation of the 2020 final, the final hosts were shifted back a year, so the 2022 final was given to the Krestovsky Stadium in Saint Petersburg. Following the Russian invasion of Ukraine on 24 February, UEFA called an extraordinary meeting of the executive committee a day later, and the final was relocated to the Stade de France. Before the match, chaos descended following issues with crowd control, which led to kickoff being delayed by 36 minutes. Real Madrid won the match 1–0, winning their 14th Champions League title.

Background
Liverpool played in their 10th European Cup/UEFA Champions League final. They had previously won six finals (in 1977, 1978, 1981, 1984, 2005 and 2019) and lost three (in 1985, 2007 and 2018). This was the fourth UEFA Champions League final for manager Jürgen Klopp, after his loss with Borussia Dortmund in 2013 and the Liverpool finals in 2018 and 2019. In addition to their six European Cup/UEFA Champions League titles, Liverpool also played in one European Cup Winners' Cup final, losing in 1966 against Borussia Dortmund, and in four UEFA Cup/Europa League finals, winning in 1973, 1976 and 2001 and losing in 2016. Their manager Jürgen Klopp was seeking to become the fourth consecutive German to manage a Champions League-winning club.

Real Madrid played in a record 17th European Cup/UEFA Champions League final, and the first since their win in 2018 against Liverpool. They previously won 13 finals (in 1956, 1957, 1958, 1959, 1960, 1966, 1998, 2000, 2002, 2014, 2016, 2017 and 2018) and lost three (1962, 1964 and 1981). Their manager Carlo Ancelotti reached a record fifth UEFA Champions League final as manager, winning in 2003 and 2007 and losing in 2005 while in charge of Milan, and winning the 2014 final with Real Madrid, and was seeking to become the first manager in history to win four UEFA Champions League titles and eight European trophies. Real Madrid also played in two European Cup Winners' Cup finals (losing in 1971 and 1983) and two UEFA Cup finals (winning in 1985 and 1986).

This was a record-third time that the two teams meet in the final, after the 1981 final, which was held in the Parc des Princes in Paris and in which Liverpool prevailed 1–0, and the 2018 final held at the Olimpiyskiy National Sports Complex in Kyiv, which was won 3–1 by Real Madrid. This was also the third final for Carlo Ancelotti as manager against Liverpool, after the 2005 and 2007 finals; he also lost the 1984 final as a player for Roma. This was the sixth time a Spanish side met an English team in the final of the competition, after the 1981, 2006 (won by Barcelona against Arsenal), the 2009 and 2011 finals (both won by Barcelona against Manchester United), and the 2018 final.

Besides the 1981 and 2018 finals, the two clubs had met each other six times. Liverpool won both matches in the 2008–09 UEFA Champions League round of 16 (1–0 away and 4–0 at home). The two clubs were drawn in the same group in the 2014–15 UEFA Champions League group stage, with Real Madrid winning 3–0 away and 1–0 at home. In the 2020–21 quarter-finals, the Spanish side won 3–1 at home and held a 0–0 draw at Anfield to ensure progression to the semi-finals.

Previous finals
In the following table, finals until 1992 were in the European Cup era, since 1993 were in the UEFA Champions League era.

Venue

The final was originally awarded to the Allianz Arena in Munich, Germany. When the COVID-19 pandemic forced the 2020 final to be relocated from the Atatürk Olympic Stadium in Istanbul to the Estádio da Luz in Lisbon, the Allianz Arena was reawarded with the 2023 final and the 2022 final was given to the original host of the 2021 final, the Krestovsky Stadium in Saint Petersburg.

Following the Russian invasion of Ukraine in February 2022, UEFA organised an emergency meeting of its executive committee on 25 February, at which it decided to move the final to the Stade de France in Saint-Denis. Other cities proposed as replacement hosts were Amsterdam, Barcelona, Munich and Rome. This was the first UEFA Champions League final to take place in France since 2006.

Host selection

An open bidding process was launched on 28 September 2018 by UEFA to select the venues of the finals of the UEFA Champions League, UEFA Europa League, and UEFA Women's Champions League in 2021. Associations had until 26 October 2018 to express interest, and bid dossiers must be submitted by 15 February 2019. UEFA announced on 1 November 2018 that two associations had expressed interest in hosting the 2021 UEFA Champions League final, and on 22 February 2019 that both associations submitted their dossiers by the deadline.

The Krestovsky Stadium was selected by the UEFA Executive Committee during their meeting in Ljubljana, Slovenia on 24 September 2019, where the hosts for the 2021 and 2023 UEFA Champions League finals were also appointed.

On 17 June 2020, the UEFA Executive Committee announced that due to the postponement and relocation of the 2020 final caused by the COVID-19 pandemic in Europe, Saint Petersburg would instead host the 2022 final.

Road to the final

Note: In all results below, the score of the finalist is given first (H: home; A: away).

Pre-match

Promotion
The original logo of the 2022 UEFA Champions League final at Saint Petersburg was unveiled at the group stage draw on 26 August 2021 in Istanbul. Originally, former Russian forward Andrey Arshavin was chosen to be the ambassador for the final. However, he was removed after the final's relocation to Saint-Denis.

Officials

On 11 May 2022, UEFA named Frenchman Clément Turpin as the referee for the final. Turpin had been a FIFA referee since 2010, and was previously the fourth official in the 2018 UEFA Champions League final, also between Real Madrid and Liverpool. In the previous season he was the referee for the 2021 UEFA Europa League Final between Villarreal and Manchester United. He officiated eight prior matches in the 2021–22 Champions League season, with two matches in qualification, four in the group stage and two knockout fixtures. He served as a referee at the UEFA European Championship in 2016 and 2020, as well as at the 2018 FIFA World Cup in Russia. Turpin also was a video assistant referee at the 2017 FIFA Confederations Cup in Russia (including in the final), the 2017 FIFA Club World Cup in the United Arab Emirates and the 2019 FIFA Women's World Cup in France

Turpin was joined by five of his fellow countrymen, including assistant referees Nicolas Danos and Cyril Gringore. Benoît Bastien served as the fourth official. Jérôme Brisard acted as the video assistant referee (VAR), with Willy Delajod appointed as one of the assistant VAR officials, along with Italian referees Massimiliano Irrati and Filippo Meli.

Opening ceremony
Cuban-born American singer Camila Cabello performed for the opening ceremony before the start of the match. Cabello performed her songs "Señorita", "La Buena Vida", "Havana", "Bam Bam" and "Don't Go Yet".

Issues entering stadium and match delay

Crowd control descended into chaos at the entrances to the Stade de France prior to the beginning of the match. By 21:00 local time, the originally scheduled kick-off time, thousands of seats remained empty in the Liverpool end. For "security reasons", the kick-off was initially delayed by 15 minutes to 21:15. This was further delayed by 15 minutes to 21:30, before being pushed back another 6 minutes to 21:36. The match eventually started at 21:37.

Match

Summary

First half
The match kicked off at the delayed time of 21:36 in front of a crowd of 75,000. In the 16th minute, Trent Alexander-Arnold played the ball across the Real Madrid penalty area which ended up being hit towards goal by Mohamed Salah before being saved by Thibaut Courtois for the first effort of the match. Five minutes later, Thiago Alcântara played a ball through to Sadio Mané who managed to make space for himself and take a shot which was saved on to the left post by Courtois. In the 34th minute, Alexander-Arnold played another cross into the Madrid penalty area towards Salah, who managed to direct a header towards goal but straight at Courtois. 

Two minutes before half-time, Karim Benzema made a clear run towards the Liverpool penalty area on the right and managed to take the ball under control before attempting to pass the ball across before being cut out by Ibrahima Konaté. However, a mix up between the Liverpool defender as well as goalkeeper Alisson allowed Federico Valverde to try and step in to intercept, with Liverpool midfielder Fabinho also forced to intervene. Amongst the attempts to win the ball, it ended up falling to Benzema again who then passed the ball into the net. However, the goal was disallowed initially by the assistant referee and then also by the VAR after a check of three minutes and 20 seconds. Benzema was shown to be in an offside position when the ball came to him, however there was controversy as to whether the last touch off of Fabinho was intentional or not. There were three minutes of stoppage time.

Second half

Neither side made any lineup changes during the interval. Liverpool continued where they left off, as nine minutes into the second half Alexander-Arnold played in another cross towards the Real Madrid penalty area which was not far from the head of Thiago and ended up being punched away by Courtois. In the 59th minute, Madrid took the lead against the run of play; Valverde made a run with the ball on the right hand side, before eventually playing a low cross towards Vinícius Júnior in the penalty area who managed to tuck the ball into the net to make it 1–0, having been left unmarked and Alisson left stranded on the other side of the goal.

Fabinho received the first and only booking of the night, after being shown a yellow card in the 62nd minute by referee Clément Turpin for a challenge on Valverde. With 24 minutes remaining, Liverpool pressed for an equaliser. Salah came forward with the ball and tried a shot from just outside the penalty area which ended up being saved to the right side of his goal by Courtois. Liverpool then made their first substitution of the final in the 65th minute, as Luis Díaz came off for Diogo Jota. Liverpool pushed again for a goal as a header across the face of goal by Jota almost found its way towards Salah, but was blocked off by Courtois. Madrid then had a chance to score another in the 75th minute, as a free kick into the Liverpool penalty area by Toni Kroos found its way to Casemiro who then tried to play the ball across towards Benzema and Vinícius, but was collected by Andrew Robertson.

Liverpool then made their two more changes, as Thiago and captain Jordan Henderson came off for Naby Keïta and Roberto Firmino in the 77th minute. Liverpool continued to push for the equaliser, as passing took place between Salah and Firmino before Salah took another shot from just outside the penalty area which ended up being deflected off of Jota and carefully beaten away by Courtois down his bottom left. Salah came forward again with eight minutes left, as a ball over the top from Fabinho found its way to the Egyptian who tried to battle off Ferland Mendy before coming across and having his resulting effort be saved by Courtois. Madrid made their first change of the match in the 86th minute, as Valverde came off for Eduardo Camavinga. At the end of regular time, the fourth official displayed that a minimum of five minutes of stoppage time would be played. Madrid made their two other substitutions in stoppage time, as Dani Ceballos came on for Luka Modrić in the 90th minute and goalscorer Vinícius was brought off in the 93rd minute for Rodrygo. Despite Liverpool's continued pushes for a goal in the final moments, the match was brought to an end with Madrid winning 1–0.

Details
The "home" team (for administrative purposes) was determined by an additional draw held after the quarter-final and semi-final draws.

Statistics

Post-match
With their win, Real Madrid secured a record-extending 14th title in the European Cup/Champions League. The club has won twice as many titles as the next-best team, Milan (7 titles). This was Madrid's fifth title in nine seasons (since 2013–14), their eighth consecutive win in a Champions League final, and their tenth successive victory in a major European final (including the 1985 and 1986 UEFA Cup Finals). Real Madrid has not lost a final in the Champions League era, with their last defeat occurring in 1981. Real Madrid also claimed their fourth European double (after 1956–57, 1957–58 and 2016–17). With the win, Spanish teams extended their streak of 17 straight major European finals won against non-Spanish opposition. Real Madrid goalkeeper Thibaut Courtois was selected as the man of the match, having made nine saves in the game, a record in the final since Opta began keeping records in 2003–04. His 59 saves during the campaign also set a new Champions League single-season record since Opta began keeping records.

Carlo Ancelotti became the first manager to win four Champions League titles, having previously won the 2003 and 2007 tournaments with Milan, and the 2014 title with Madrid. Conversely, Jürgen Klopp tied Marcello Lippi for most losses in Champions League finals. Klopp had previously lost with Borussia Dortmund in 2013 and Liverpool in 2018. Nine players secured their fifth Champions League title with the win, with eight (Gareth Bale, Karim Benzema, Dani Carvajal, Casemiro, Isco, Marcelo, Luka Modrić and Nacho) doing so with Real Madrid's wins in 2014 and from 2016 to 2018. Toni Kroos won his first title with Bayern Munich in 2013, before winning with Real Madrid from 2016 to 2018. They joined former Real Madrid player Cristiano Ronaldo as the only players to have won five titles in the Champions League era.

See also
2018 UEFA Champions League final – contested between same teams
2022 UEFA Europa League final
2022 UEFA Europa Conference League final
2022 UEFA Women's Champions League final
2022 UEFA Super Cup
Liverpool F.C. in international football
Real Madrid CF in international football

Notes

References

External links

2022
Final
May 2022 sports events in France
European Cup Final 2022
2021–22 in English football
Champions League final 2022
2021–22 in Spanish football
International club association football competitions hosted by France
2021–22 in French football
2022 in Paris
Sports competitions in Paris
Sports events affected by the 2022 Russian invasion of Ukraine
France–United Kingdom relations